Paulo Renato is the name of:
Paulo Renato (actor) (1924–1981), Portuguese actor
Paulo Renato (footballer), Portuguese footballer
Paulo Renato Souza (1945–2011), Brazilian politician